Santa Gertrudis-Boca del Infierno Provincial Park, legally Santa-Boca Provincial Park, is a provincial park on Nootka Island in British Columbia, Canada. It was established on 30 April 1996 to protect and Santa Gertrudis Cove and Boca del Infierno Bay, which are located on the southeastern shore of Nootka Island.

Etymology
Boca del Infierno means "Bay of Fury" or "Bay of Hell" while Santa Gertrudis Cove is from the Spanish name for Saint Gertrude.

References

Provincial parks of British Columbia
Nootka Sound region
Spanish history in the Pacific Northwest
Protected areas established in 1996
1996 establishments in British Columbia